The Bible Lands Museum is an archaeological museum in Jerusalem, that explores the culture of the peoples mentioned in the Bible including ancient Egyptians, Canaanites, Philistines, Arameans, Hittites, Elamites, Phoenicians and Persians.

Overview
The aim of the museum is to put the various peoples covered into historical context. The museum is located on Museum Row in Givat Ram, between the Israel Museum, the National Campus for the Archaeology of Israel, and the Bloomfield Science Museum.

History
The museum was founded by Elie Borowski in 1992 to house his personal collection. On a visit to Jerusalem in 1981, he met Batya Weiss who encouraged him to bring his collection of Ancient Near Eastern Art from biblical times to Israel and establish a museum. She put him in contact with Jerusalem mayor Teddy Kollek. Borowski heeded her advice, built the Bible Lands Museum and moved his collection from a museum in Toronto to Jerusalem. Elie and Batya eventually married.

Exhibits 
The main gallery displays hundreds of artifacts: ancient documents, idols, coins, statues, weapons, pottery, and seals from across the ancient Near East. Many topics are elaborated upon in brief articles on the walls (e.g. the origins of the alphabet, embalming, and Abraham's journey). The museum also exhibits scale models of ancient sites in Jerusalem, a Ziggurat at Ur and the pyramids at Giza. While the museum's emphasis is the history of ancient Near Eastern civilizations, the curators draw attention to relevant biblical verses. For example, above a gallery of ancient Anatolian jugs is the verse "Behold, Rebecca came forth with her pitcher on her shoulder; and she went down unto the fountain and drew water" (Genesis 24:45).

Main gallery
The main gallery consists of 20 numbered sections in chronological order:

From Hunter to Urban Dweller
The Coming of Civilizations
Symbolic Communication
Literate Voices, the Story of Writing
The Pre-Patriarchal World
The Sumerian Temple
Old Kingdom of Egypt
Genesis 14, the Age of Warfare
The Age of the Patriarchs
When Israel Sojourned in Egypt
The Sea Peoples
The Arrival of the Iranian Horsemen
Stones of Aram
Israel Among the Nations
Assyria, the Rod of My Anger
The Splendor of Persia
Hellenistic Dominions
Rome and Judaea
Roman and Coptic Egypt
Sassanian Mesopotamia – Home of the Babylonian Talmud

Exhibitions 2017
Jerusalem In Babylon: New light on the Judean Exiles including Al-Yahudu Tablets
Gods, Heroes and Mortals in Ancient Greece
In the Valley of David and Goliath

References

External links

The Bible Lands Museum website 

1992 establishments in Israel
Museums established in 1992
Museums in Jerusalem
Archaeological museums in Israel
Egyptological collections
Museums of Ancient Near East in Israel